Following is a list of justices of the New Hampshire Supreme Court:

List of chief justices of the Superior Court of Judicature (1776–1876)
Meshech Weare (1776–1782)
Samuel Livermore (1782–1790)
Josiah Bartlett (1790)
John Pickering (1790–1795) 
Simeon Olcott (1795–1802)
Jeremiah Smith (1802–1809) 
Arthur Livermore (1809–1813)
Jeremiah Smith (1813–1816)
William Merchant Richardson (1816–1838)
Joel Parker (1838–1848)
John James Gilchrist (1848–1855)
Andrew Salter Woods (1855)
Ira Perley (1855–1859)
Samuel Dana Bell (1859–1864) 
Ira Perley (1864–1869)
Henry Adams Bellows (1869–1873)
J. Everett Sargent (1873–1874)
Edmund L. Cushing (1874–1876)

List of chief justices of the Supreme Court (1876–present)
Charles Cogswell Doe (1876–1896)
Alonzo Philetus Carpenter (1896–1898)
Lewis Whitehouse Clark (1898)
Isaac N. Blodgett (1898–1902)
Frank Naismith Parsons (1902–1924)
Robert J. Peaslee (1924–1934)
John E. Allen (1934–1943)
Thomas L. Marble (1943–1946)
Oliver Winslow Branch (1946–1949)
Francis Wayland Johnston (1949–1952)
Frank Rowe Kenison (1952–1977)
Edward John Lampron (1978–1979) 
William Alvan Grimes (1979–1981)
John W. King (1981–1986)
David A. Brock (1986–2004)
John T. Broderick Jr. (2004–2010)
Linda Stewart Dalianis (2010–2018)
Robert J. Lynn (2018–2019)
Gary E. Hicks (acting, 2019-2021)
Gordon J. MacDonald (2021–present)

All justices

External links
 New Hampshire: Chief Justices of the Supreme Court

New Hampshire
Justices